Pristimantis viridicans is a species of frog in the family Strabomantidae.
It is endemic to Colombia.
Its natural habitat is tropical moist montane forests.
It is threatened by habitat loss.

References

viridicans
Frogs of South America
Amphibians of Colombia
Endemic fauna of Colombia
Amphibians of the Andes
Amphibians described in 1977
Taxonomy articles created by Polbot